USS Wissoe II (SP-153) was an armed motorboat that served in the United States Navy as a patrol vessel from 1917 to 1919.
 
Wissoe II was built as a civilian motorboat in 1916 by the New York Yacht, Launch, and Engine Company at Morris Heights in the Bronx, New York. The U.S. Navy acquired her on 23 April 1917 from her owner, Mr. George L. Carnegie of Fernandina, Florida, for use as a patrol boat during World War I. She was commissioned on 30 April 1917 as USS Wissoe II (SP-153).

Wissoe II was assigned to the 6th Naval District, where she operated as a section patrol boat along the southeastern coast of the United States, guarding against incursions by German submarines.

Wissoe II was decommissioned soon after the end of the war. She was returned to her owner on 18 January 1919, and was stricken from the Navy Directory the same day.

References

NavSource Online: Section Patrol Craft Photo Archive: Wissoe II (SP 153)

Patrol vessels of the United States Navy
World War I patrol vessels of the United States
Ships built in Morris Heights, Bronx
1916 ships